Bastarache is a French surname of Basque origin. It was formed as a patronym of Basterreche, which itself is a topographic name for someone who lived in a house by a boundary, or on the edge of a settlement or the corner of a street. It is ultimately derived from Basque bazter ("border", "edge") and eche ("house"). It was one of the original Acadian surnames.

Notable people
Notable people with this surname include:
 Michel Bastarache dit Basque (1730-1820), Canadian Acadian
 Michel Bastarache (born 1947), Canadian judge

Places
The hamlet of Bastarache in Sainte-Marie-de-Kent, New Brunswick was named after early settlers Joseph Bastarache, Isidore Bastarache or Peter Bastarache, or after Adrien Bastarache, the first postmaster.

References

French-language surnames
Basque-language surnames